Stanka Gjurić (born 20 January 1956) is a Croatian poet, essayist, actress, filmmaker and ex model. She is a member of the Croatian Writers' Association, Croatian Academy of Science and Art in Diaspora (Basel, Switzerland) and Croatian Society of Composers. She has also acted in seven feature films.

Biography
Stanka Gjurić was born in Čakovec, FNR Yugoslavia (modern-day Croatia). Today she lives in Zagreb. She has published 20 books (mainly poems, philosophical and lyrical essays). Since 2006 has also worked as a film maker, gaining worldwide acclaim with her short film Ubojite misli (Battle Thoughts). Her short films have been screened in film festivals in France, Italy, Greece, Spain, Portugal, Slovenia, Bosnia and Herzegovina, Canada, India, Egypt, and Switzerland, and she has won five awards.

Family
Stanka's mother Stanka, aka Lela (born Kopjar, 1934-2018, Čakovec), worked as a typist at the Municipal Court in Čakovec, while her father, Dragan Gjurić (1929-2002, Čakovec), was the director of accounting at the G.K. "Međimurje". Stanka is a unit, but his father has two older half-brothers, Tomislav (born in 1949) and Roman (born in 1952). By the way, Stanka's distant cousin is Alojzije Mišić, the bishop of Mostar-Duvno, and the apostolic administrator of Trebinje-Mrkan from 1912 until his death in 1942. Alojzije (Stjepan) Mišić's parents were Mate and Marija (nee Cigić) Mišić. Alojzije had two sisters, Marija and Persa. Marija married Ivan Gjurić (Stanka's great-grandfather, ie the father of her grandfather Andrija), who with Marija, in addition to Andrija, had three other children (Antun, Ljudevit and Viktorija). Alojzije Mišić's sister, Persa, was a nun.

Poetry
 Sedmi pečat, 1981
 Treći čin, 1983
 Dječak, 1986
 Ključarev san, 1990
 Il sogno del guardiano, 1994
 Protuotrov ili njegovanje ludila, 1994 
 Protuotrov ili njegovanje ludila, 1998
 Sve što sja, 2005
 Kažnjavalac dobrih navika, 2005
 Bešćutnost akvarela, 2008
 Protuotrov ili njegovanje ludila/Contravveleno o coltivazione della follia, 2017
 Nepremostiva, 2020

Essays
 Lekcija o drskosti, 2000 
 Umijeće življenja, 2015 
 Kroz Eros i Thanatos, 2017
 Unveiling reality, 2018
 Istina o sreći, 2018
 Budnost, 2022

Opinion piece
 Otpovijed, 2014
 Otpovijed (II dio), 2015

Diary prose
Dnevnik vodonoše/The Diary of an Aquarian, 2010

Filmography

Acting roles
That Summer of White Roses, as White Rose(1989)
Vjetar u mreži, as A Woman in a Dream  (1989)
Školjka šumi, as Barmaid (1991)
Vrijeme za, as Daughter in Law (1992)
Tu, as Nurse (2003)
Kad zvoni?, as Nurse (2005)
S druge strane, as The old man's daughter (2016)
Koja je ovo država! as Faruk's wife Enisa (2018)
Link as Stanka Gjurić (2021)

Directing
 Battle Thoughts (Ubojite misli, 2006) - short
 Sleeping and dreaming (Spavanje i sanjanje, 2006) - short
 Exhibitionist (Susret s egzibicionistom, 2006) - short
 Passion for book has not disappeared (Strast za knjigom nije nestala, 2007) - short
 Eleven (Jedanaest, 2007) - short
 Happy boat (Sretan brod, 2007) - short
 Courtyard window (Dvorišni prozor, 2007) - short
 Luka's prophecy (Lukino proročanstvo, 2007) - short
 Alexandrian poets (Aleksandrijski pjesnici, 2008) - short
 The sound of life (Zvuci života, 2008) - short
 Bast (2009) - short
 Bon Appétit!(Dobar tek!, 2009) - short
 Noon Shot (Zagrebačko podne, 2009) - short
 Lullaby (Uspavanka,2010) - short
 Immoral Manual (Nemoralna čitanka, 2013) - short
 Lioncity (Lavograd, 2015) - short
 Perfect Tattoo (2016) - short
 Rhythm (Ritam, 2019) - short
 Once upon a time (Jednom davno, 2020) - short
 Link (2021) - short
 Summer morning) - short
 Bread (Kruh, 2022) - short
 Lust and the heart (O požudi i srcu, 2022) - short
 Son of a Prophetess'' (Vračarin sin, 2022) - short

References

Sources
 Croatian Writers' Association
 
 Hrvatski audio vizualni centar
 The Official Site

Living people
20th-century Croatian poets
Croatian women poets
Croatian non-fiction writers
Croatian women essayists
Croatian film actresses
People from Čakovec
21st-century Croatian poets
20th-century essayists
21st-century essayists
20th-century Croatian women writers
21st-century Croatian women writers
Croatian essayists
Croatian documentary film directors
Writers from Zagreb
Croatian women film directors
Croatian philosophers
Croatian literature
1956 births
Women documentary filmmakers
Actresses from Zagreb
Film people from Zagreb